Shahyaz Yezdi "Yaz" Mubarakai (born 24 October 1975) is an Australian politician. He has been a Labor member of the Western Australian Legislative Assembly since the 2017 state election, representing Jandakot.

Mubarakai was born in India, and emigrated to Australia in 1997. He belongs to the Parsi community. He owns the post office at Success and the Majestic India and Cafe Royal at Cockburn Central, and previously served on Cockburn City Council.

References

1975 births
Living people
Australian Labor Party members of the Parliament of Western Australia
Australian people of Parsi descent
Members of the Western Australian Legislative Assembly
Indian emigrants to Australia
Western Australian local councillors
Australian Zoroastrians
Politicians from Mumbai
21st-century Australian politicians